Josu Etxaniz Irazabal (born 6 December 1985 in Elgeta, Gipuzkoa) is a Spanish footballer who plays as a central defender.

External links

1985 births
Living people
People from Debagoiena
Sportspeople from Gipuzkoa
Spanish footballers
Footballers from the Basque Country (autonomous community)
Association football defenders
Segunda División players
Segunda División B players
Tercera División players
SD Eibar footballers
Barakaldo CF footballers
Zamora CF footballers
SD Lemona footballers
Club Portugalete players
Zamudio SD players